The 1913 Colorado Mines Orediggers football team was an American football team that represented the Colorado School of Mines in the Rocky Mountain Conference (RMC) during the 1912 college football season. The team compiled a 5–1 record and outscored opponents by a total of 127 to 47.

Schedule

References

Colorado Mines
Colorado Mines Orediggers football seasons
Colorado Mines Orediggers football